Simon James Stevenson Smith (born 8 December 1979, in Northumberland) is a Scottish cricketer. A wicketkeeper, Smith is the understudy to his namesake Colin Smith and has appeared in the Intercontinental Cup for Scotland four times. His maiden first-class game was against Ireland in 2004 and the rest came during the 2007 tournament.

Career Best Performances
Updated 22 June 2011

External links
Cricinfo
Cricket Archive

1979 births
Living people
Scottish cricketers
Scotland Twenty20 International cricketers
Sportspeople from Ashington
Cricketers from Northumberland
Scottish cricket coaches
Wicket-keepers